Strange Girl is a 1962 Yugoslav drama film directed by Jovan Živanović.

Cast 
 Špela Rozin - Minja
 Voja Mirić - Nenad
 Zoran Radmilović - Pedja
 Ljubiša Jocić - Profesor slikanja
 Dragoš Kalajić - Boba

External links 

1962 drama films
1962 films
Serbian drama films
Yugoslav drama films
Films set in Yugoslavia
Yugoslav black-and-white films